Bayazidabad or Bayezidabad may refer to:
 Bayazidabad, Baneh, Kurdistan Province
 Bayazidabad, Divandarreh, Kurdistan Province
 Bayezidabad, West Azerbaijan